Henry of Blois (c. 1096 8 August 1171), often known as Henry of Winchester, was Abbot of Glastonbury Abbey from 1126, and Bishop of Winchester from 1129 to his death. He was a younger son of Stephen Henry, Count of Blois by Adela of Normandy, daughter of William the Conqueror and Matilda of Flanders. Thus, he was a younger brother of Stephen, King of England, and a grandchild of William the Conqueror. Henry was also a major patron of the arts.

Early life and education
Henry was one of five sons of Stephen II, Count of Blois, by Adela of Normandy (daughter of William the Conqueror) and the younger brother of King Stephen. His birth date is uncertain, along with his siblings but he was the 4th or youngest son and he was most likely born at Blois c.1096, before his father left on the first crusade, or possibly c.1100, soon after his father's return.  Henry's father died in 1102 while on crusade during the Second Battle of Ramla, leaving an estate with more than 350 castles and large properties in France including Chartres.

Henry was educated at Cluny and adhered to the principles of Cluniac reform, which included a sense of intellectual freedom and humanism, as well as a high standard of devotion and discipline.

Abbot and bishop

Henry was brought to England by King Henry I, to be Abbot of Glastonbury. On 4 October 1129, he was given the bishopric of Winchester and allowed to keep his beloved Glastonbury Abbey. He was consecrated bishop on 17 November 1129. He had ambitions to become Archbishop of Canterbury, but refused to abandon his work and obligations to Glastonbury. Soon after his appointment to the see of Winchester, Henry came to resent his subservience to Canterbury.  He therefore set about building a power-base to persuade the king to create a third, West Country archdiocese with himself at the head.  This scheme was unsuccessful.  However, on 1 March 1139, during the reign of his brother Stephen, Henry obtained a commission as papal legate, which gave him higher rank than Theobald of Bec, Archbishop of Canterbury, making him the most powerful figure in the English Church during the troubled times of the so-called "Anarchy". Thus, when his brother was unavailable, Henry of Blois was the most powerful, and possibly the wealthiest, man in England.

Stephen of Blois was crowned King of England in 1135, but the relations between the two brothers were not always peaceful. After the Battle of Lincoln in 1141, Henry found it more advantageous to support Empress Matilda; but later found her arrogant and greedy. Later that year, Henry rejoined his brother's side and, with the help of Queen Matilda and an army commanded by William of Ypres, his successful defence of Winchester against the Empress was the turning point of the civil war. As Abbot of Glastonbury, Henry remained in contact with Peter the Venerable at Cluny and was made aware of most of the controversies on the continent, specifically the persecution of Peter Abelard  (whom Peter the Venerable defended) and the translation of the Koran from Arabic to Latin (which Peter the Venerable commissioned).

Architecture
Before and after his elevation to Bishop, Henry of Blois was an advisor to his brother Stephen and survived him. Henry of Blois engineered hundreds of projects, including villages and canals, abbeys and smaller churches. He was most proud of his contributions to the greatest developments at Glastonbury Abbey, long before the destructive fire of 1184. Unlike most bishops of his age, Henry had a passion for architecture. He built the final additions to Winchester Cathedral and Wolvesey Castle in Winchester, including a tourist tunnel under the cathedral to make it easier for pilgrims to view relics. He also designed and built additions to many palaces and large houses including the castle of Farnham, Surrey and began the construction of the Hospital of St Cross at Winchester. In London he built Winchester Palace as a residence for the bishops of Winchester. In Rome, John of Salisbury reported, he acquired an impressive number of ancient Roman sculptures, defending his purchases as preventing  the Romans of his day from worshipping these "idols".

Henry was responsible for building six castles in 1138, namely those at Bishop's Waltham, Downton, Farnham, Merdon, Taunton, and Wolvesey. Contemporaries were surprised that a bishop would be such a prolific builder of fortification. Much of Henry's work was undone in 1155, when the new king, Henry II, ordered that his castles be thrown down.

Literature
Henry was also enamoured of books and their distribution. He wrote or sponsored several books including On the Antiquity of the Glastonbury Church by William of Malmesbury, a close personal friend. He sponsored the Winchester Bible, the largest illustrated Bible ever produced. It is a huge folio edition standing nearly three feet in height. This Bible is still on display at Winchester, although it was never fully finished.  His production of the Winchester Psalter, also known as the Blois Psalter, is preserved in the British Library and is considered a British National Treasure.

Later years and death

The expiration of Henry's legatine commission when Pope Innocent II died on 23 September 1143 deprived him of much of his power. His efforts to renew the commission were unsuccessful, but he made a personal visit to Rome and secured several favours for Glastonbury and the Benedictine order in general. Shortly after his brother's death and the accession of Henry II, the bishop retired to Cluny, where he had sent much treasure, for at least two years and mourned there his mentor Peter the Venerable, who died on Christmas Day, 1156.

In his later years, he was among the Bishops forced to agree to the Constitutions of Clarendon in January 1164, which paved the way for the Becket Controversy. He was also appointed to preside over the trial of Thomas Becket and secretly supported Becket's family before and after his assassination.

Henry died on 8 August 1171. Among his gifts to Cluny, was a pyx set with gems in the choir. Henry of Blois is now buried in Winchester Cathedral in a plain stone crypt in the choir, but there is a controversy because some sources claim he was buried at Cluny. Recent research indicates he was also entombed for a time in a small church (St Mary the Virgin) at Ivinghoe, Buckinghamshire. One explanation describes his heart enshrined at Cluny while his corpse and other artifacts were moved from Ivinghoe to Winchester in the 17th century. For many years his sarcophagus was thought to be that of King  William Rufus son of William  the Conqueror. During his lifetime, he was arguably the richest and most powerful  man in England, and  has been referred to as a king without a throne, and the power behind the throne.  In the Antiquities, William of Malmesbury who knew the bishop well, described him, saying, "Yet, in spite of his noble birth he blushes when praised."

Citations

References

 
   
 British History Online Bishops of Winchester accessed on 2 November 2007
 
 History of Farnham Castle accessed on 2 November 2007

Further reading

 Nakashian, Craig M. Warrior Churchmen of Medieval England, 1000-1250: Theory and Reality. Woodbridge: The Boydell Press, 2016

 
 Jeffrey West, "A Taste for the Antique? Henry of Blois and the Arts," in C. P. Lewis (ed), Anglo-Norman Studies XXX: Proceedings of the Battle Conference 2007 (Woodbridge, Boydell Press, 2008), 213–230.

1090s births
1171 deaths

Year of birth uncertain
Abbots of Glastonbury
Bishops of Winchester
12th-century English Roman Catholic bishops
Burials at Winchester Cathedral
People of The Anarchy
Anglo-Normans
House of Blois